Hashemabad (also Romanized as Hāshemābād; also known as Hāsemābād and Īsmābād) is a village in Hojr Rural District, in the Central District of Sahneh County, Kermanshah Province, Iran. At the 2006 census, its population was 225, in 47 families.

References 

Populated places in Sahneh County